Ouellé is a town in east-central Ivory Coast. It is a sub-prefecture and commune of Ouellé Department in Iffou Region, Lacs District.

In 2014, the population of the sub-prefecture of Ouellé was 27,521.

Villages
The 21 villages of the sub-prefecture of Ouellé and their population in 2014 are:

References

Sub-prefectures of Iffou
Communes of Iffou